In Mandaeism, a yardna or yardena ([]) is a body of flowing fresh water (or in ; pronounced mia h(a)yya) that is suitable for ritual use as baptismal water. The masbuta and other Mandaean rituals such as the tamasha can only be performed in a yardna. Stagnant fresh water, brackish water, and seawater are not considered to be yardnas.

Examples of yardnas
Although etymologically related to the Canaanite word yarden, or the Jordan River, a yardna in Mandaeism can refer to any flowing river. Traditionally, these were typically the Euphrates (Mandaic: Praš), Tigris (Mandaic: Diglat), and Karun (Mandaic: ʿUlat) rivers. The Euphrates is called  (pronounced ) in the Ginza Rabba. In Mandaean scriptures, the Euphrates is considered to be the earthly manifestation of the heavenly yardna or flowing river (similar to the Yazidi concept of Lalish being the earthly manifestation of its heavenly counterpart).

In Worcester, Massachusetts, United States, Lake Quinsigamond (the source of the Quinsigamond River) is used as a yardna for baptism. In San Antonio and Austin, Texas, the Guadalupe River is the main yardna used.

In Australia, the Nepean River is the yardna that is most commonly used by Mandaeans. In Sweden, particularly during the winter, indoor swimming pools with flowing water are used as ritual yardnas in mandis.

Heavenly counterpart
Piriawis, a river in the World of Light, is the heavenly counterpart of all yardnas on earth, which are considered by Mandaeans to be manifestations of Piriawis.

Sacramental water
There are two types of sacramental water used for Mandaean rituals, namely mambuha ("drinking water") and halalta ("rinsing water"). Both are drawn directly from a yardna.

See also
Qasr al-Yahud
Al-Maghtas
Holy water
Holy well
Rivers in Hinduism
Living Water
Water of Life (Christianity)

References

 

Jordan River
Water and religion
Baptism
Mandaic words and phrases